William Briscoe (6 November 1896 – 7 February 1994) was an English footballer who played as a forward.

A former Watford, Stoke, Milton Brotherhood, and Leek United player; he first turned professional with Port Vale in 1918. After five years he moved on to Congleton Town for a season, only to return to Vale in 1924. He then spent the next seven years with the club, racking up a combined total of 307 league appearances for the club over his two spells, scoring 51 goals. He returned to Congleton in 1931 before later retiring from the game.

He also played cricket for Staffordshire in the Minor Counties Championship from 1921 to 1925.

Career

Briscoe appeared for Watford, Stoke (three appearances), Milton Brotherhood and Leek United before signing professional forms with Port Vale in January 1918. The club were re-elected into the Football League in October 1919, and Briscoe scored his first Second Division goal on 15 November, in a 2–1 defeat at Clapton Orient. In total he scored 10 goals in 25 appearances in 1919–20. He scored past rivals Stoke on 25 September 1920, in a 2–1 win at The Old Recreation Ground. He also got on the scoresheet at Molineux and the City Ground to take his league tally to three goals in 35 games in 1920–21. He featured 34 times in 1921–22, scoring just the one goal. He was a member of the sides that shared the North Staffordshire Infirmary Cup in 1920 and 1922. He hit three goals in 40 appearances in 1922–23.

Briscoe failed to agree terms with the Port Vale board in the summer of 1923, and switched to nearby non-league side Congleton Town. In January 1924, Vale offered better terms and he re-signed. Despite only playing 21 games, he finished the 1923–24 season as joint-top scorer, tied with Tom Page on 10 goals. He scored 12 goals in 44 games in 1924–25, missing just the one match all season, though the prolific Wilf Kirkham now took on the mantel as the club's main source of goals. He hit four of his 12 goals in an 8–2 mauling of non-league Alfreton in an FA Cup qualifier on 13 December. Briscoe scored four goals in 26 games in 1925–26, and even played a match whilst suffering from appendicitis.

Briscoe hit seven goals in 32 appearances in 1926–27, and helped the club to finish above Stoke City in the league for the first time. He hit five goals in 22 games in 1927–28, missing much of the season with a broken cheekbone. He scored twice in 25 games in 1928–29, but could not help the club to avoid relegation. He played eight league games in 1929–30, as Vale stormed to the Third Division North title. However, he did not feature in the 1930–31 season, and was given a free transfer back to Congleton Town in May 1931, who he also coached. In 13 years at the club he had played 331 games (193 in the Football League) and scored 60 goals (43 in the Football League).

Career statistics

Source:

Honours
Port Vale
Football League Third Division North: 1929–30

References

1896 births
1994 deaths
People from Fenton, Staffordshire
Footballers from Stoke-on-Trent
English footballers
Association football forwards
Watford F.C. players
Stoke City F.C. wartime guest players
Port Vale F.C. players
Congleton Town F.C. players
English Football League players
Association football coaches
English cricketers
Staffordshire cricketers
Cricketers from Stoke-on-Trent